Eén tegen 100 (1 vs. 100) is a Dutch game show that has been airing since 3 September 2000 on various channels with Caroline Tensen as host. The game pits a single contestant against 100 other people for a chance to win a larger cash prize. It is sponsored by the Nationale Postcode Loterij (National Postal Code Lottery).

Format 
One player is selected to play the game as The One against 100 other contestants. The player is selected at random from the 100 (dubbed “The Mob” in the majority of versions), and the One's objective is to eliminate all 100 contestants (or 101, in the Taiwanese version) by correctly answering multiple-choice general knowledge questions.

Depending on the version, after having the opportunity to select a difficulty level or the category, a multiple-choice question with three options is revealed. The 100 is given a short amount of time (normally 6 seconds) to lock in their answer before The One is given the opportunity to answer the question. If the One is correct, any of the 100 contestants who answered the question incorrectly are eliminated from further play, bringing the One closer to winning the game. Depending on the version, the amount of money in the contestant's bank also increases by an amount dependent on the number of contestants are eliminated in that question, or per every set of 10 Mob members eliminated. If The One eliminates all 100 contestants, depending on the version, the One claims all the money in the bank, or win the increased top prize. However, if the One is incorrect, in most versions the game ends and the One leaves with nothing, while any winnings won were split between surviving members of the 100, while some versions, notably Hong Kong, penalizes the contestant some winnings and the game continues until the One misses the question a few more times, and in the UK, where the money is not split. In most versions, the One can choose to leave the game with their accumulated winnings, or risk the winnings for another question.

The One can opt to use lifelines with (or sometimes without) assistance from the Mob, should they find the question difficult. The lifelines varies from finding out how many contestants providing the same response (called “Poll the Mob”), or discussing with two contestants at random with one being the correct answer (“Ask the Mob”) or to trust with the majority and locking the answer automatically (“Trust the Mob”). Lifelines usually stick to these rules, the most notable exception being in the original Dutch version of the rules used by some countries, where lifelines are changed drastically: the One cannot request assistance from the Mob, instead the One has three “dodges”, which halves the prize money to skip past the question, and Mob members eliminated are worth nothing. The One is usually offered a Bonus Dodge for a correct response to a question around the 1 vs. 25 level.

International versions

Video game
 1 vs. 100 (2008 video game)
 1 vs. 100 (2009 video game)

See also
Gatekeepers (game show) - A 2010 Singaporean game show with a game format similar to Eén tegen 100, but was not part of the Eén tegen 100 franchise

References

Television franchises
2000 Dutch television series debuts
2000s Dutch television series
2010s Dutch television series
2020s Dutch television series
1 vs. 100
Dutch game shows
Television series by Endemol
Tien (TV channel) original programming